The 2011-12 Coppa Titano was the 54th season of San Marino's oldest football competition. It began on 10 September 2011 with the first games of the Group Stage and ended on 2 May 2012 with the final held at Stadio Olimpico, Serravalle. Juvenes/Dogana were the defending champions, having won their second cup final last season.

The winner of the cup final entered the first qualifying round of the 2012–13 UEFA Europa League.

Competition format
The competition consisted of two stages, the Group Stage and the Elimination Rounds. The Group Stage consisted of three groups with five teams each. Every team played two games (once "home" and once "away") against every other team of its group. The top two teams from each group, as well as the two best third-placed teams, qualified for the Elimination Rounds. The Elimination Rounds was a single-game elimination tournament. Games in the Elimination Rounds were decided by extra time and, if necessary, a penalty shootout.

Group stage

Group A

Source: fsgc.sm

Group B

Source: fsgc.sm

Group C

Source: fsgc.sm

Elimination rounds

Quarterfinals
These matches took place on 23 April 2012.

|}

Semifinals
These matches took place on 27 April 2012.

|}

Final

External links
 Official website

References

Coppa Titano seasons
San Marino
Coppa